Shaliabad may refer to:
 Shaliabad, Kermanshah
 Shaliabad, West Azerbaijan